Francisco Rodrigues Saturnino de Brito (1864 in Campos dos Goytacazes, Rio de Janeiro — 1929 in Pelotas, Rio Grande do Sul) is considered the pioneer of sanitary engineering and environmental engineering in Brazil. He was a hydraulics and sanitation engineer and professor at Federal University of Rio de Janeiro. He lived in Rio de Janeiro. His son Francisco Saturnino de Brito Filho had continued his important works.

External links
 Persons Specialized in France Association. Site in French and Portuguese. Accessed in August 2006.

People from Campos dos Goytacazes
Brazilian engineers
Brazilian inventors
1864 births
Academic staff of the Federal University of Rio de Janeiro
1929 deaths